Louise Ebert (23 December 1873 in Melchiorshausen/Weyhe as Louise Rump, – 18 January 1955 in Heidelberg) on 9 May 1894 in Bremen married Friedrich Ebert, who from his election in 1919 until his death on 28 February 1925 served as the first Reichspräsident of the Weimar Republic.

The couple had four recorded sons and one recorded daughter.   The eldest son, named Friedrich like his father, served as mayor of East Berlin between 1948 and 1967.

References

External links 
 

1873 births
1955 deaths
People from Diepholz (district)
Spouses of chancellors of Germany
Spouses of presidents of Germany